Still Life with Commentator is a collaborative studio album by American jazz pianist Vijay Iyer and American hip hop musician Mike Ladd. It was released on Savoy Jazz in 2007.

Critical reception

Lyn Horton of All About Jazz gave the album 5 out of 5 stars, commenting that "This work illuminates the perils within contemporary global society from the standpoint of the media and information blitz." Sean Westergaard of AllMusic gave the album 3.5 out of 5 stars, describing it as "a dense, thought-provoking piece that takes some effort to internalize." Mike Shanley of JazzTimes wrote, "This disc exists in a musical Bermuda Triangle that conjoins jazz, electronica and that mutant, undefined style of pop music created by the likes of Björk."

Track listing

Personnel
Credits adapted from liner notes.

 Vijay Iyer – piano, synthesizer
 Mike Ladd – vocals, production, liner notes, photography
 Guillermo E. Brown – vocals, electronic percussion
 Pálína Jónsdóttir – vocals
 Masayasu Nakanishi – vocals
 Liberty Ellman – guitar
 Okkyung Lee – cello
 Pamela Z – vocals, electronic processing, translation
 Scotty Hard – production

References

External links
 

2007 albums
Collaborative albums
Vijay Iyer albums
Mike Ladd albums